Upul Indrasiri (born 2 November 1982) is a Sri Lankan first-class cricketer who has played for Bloomfield Cricket and Athletic Club. He made his Twenty20 debut on 17 August 2004, for Ragama Cricket Club in the 2004 SLC Twenty20 Tournament. He was the leading wicket-taker for Negombo Cricket Club in the 2018–19 Premier League Tournament, with 38 dismissals in nine matches.

References

External links
 

1982 births
Living people
Sri Lankan cricketers
Bloomfield Cricket and Athletic Club cricketers
Cricketers from Colombo
Chilaw Marians Cricket Club cricketers
Colombo Commandos cricketers
Negombo Cricket Club cricketers
Ragama Cricket Club cricketers